Andrej Ćilerdžić is a Serbian Orthodox prelate. He is a Bishop of the Serbian Orthodox Eparchy of Austria and Switzerland.

References

Living people
1961 births
Bishops of the Serbian Orthodox Church
Clergy from Osnabrück